Houilles is a commune in the Yvelines department in the Île-de-France region in north-central France.

History
Until 2000, the command post of French Navy's Ballistic Missile Submarine Force was based at Houilles.

Victor Schœlcher, a French abolitionist writer in the 19th century and the main spokesman for a group from Paris who worked for the abolition of slavery died in Houilles on 25 December 1893. A nursery school, a street and a statue carry his name. The house in which he died in 1893 is at 26 Avenue Schœlcher. The commune of Houilles acquired the house in 2011.

Population

Transport
Houilles is served by Houilles–Carrières-sur-Seine station on Paris RER line A and on the Transilien Paris-Saint-Lazare suburban rail line.

Education
Houilles has fifteen preschool and elementary schools and three junior high schools.

Junior high schools:
 Collège Alphonse-de-Lamartine
 Collège Guy-de-Maupassant
 Collège Sainte-Thérèse

Nearby senior high schools/sixth form colleges:
 Lycée Les-Pierres-Vives (Carrières-sur-Seine)
 Lycée Jules-Verne (Sartrouville)
 Lycée Évariste-Galois (Sartrouville)

International relations

Houilles is twinned with:
 Celorico de Basto, Portugal
 Chesham, England, United Kingdom
 Friedrichsdorf, Germany
 Schœlcher, Martinique, France

See also
Communes of the Yvelines department

References

External links

Official website (in French)

Communes of Yvelines